In Greek mythology, Dardanus (/ˈdɑːrdənəs/; Greek: Δάρδανος, Dardanos) is the name attributed to three distinct individuals:

 Dardanus, son of Zeus and Electra, and founder of the city of Dardania, of the tribe of Dardans.
 Dardanus, a Scythian king, and the father of Idaea, the wife of King Phineus.
 Dardanus, a Trojan warrior who defended the city of Ilium during the city's 10-year siege. He was the son of Bias, son of King Priam, and brother of Laogonus. Dardanus and his brother were slain by the hero Achilles during the battle. The latter thrust them both from their chariot to the ground, smiting the one with a cast of his spear and the other with his sword in close fight.

Notes

References
 Apollodorus, The Library with an English Translation by Sir James George Frazer, F.B.A., F.R.S. in 2 Volumes, Cambridge, MA, Harvard University Press; London, William Heinemann Ltd. 1921. ISBN 0-674-99135-4. Online version at the Perseus Digital Library. Greek text available from the same website.
 Diodorus Siculus, Diodorus Siculus: The Library of History. Translated by C. H. Oldfather. Twelve volumes. Loeb Classical Library. Cambridge, MA: Harvard University Press; London: William Heinemann, Ltd. 1989. Online version by Bill Thayer
Gaius Julius Hyginus, Fabulae from The Myths of Hyginus translated and edited by Mary Grant. University of Kansas Publications in Humanistic Studies. Online version at the Topos Text Project.
Homer, The Iliad with an English Translation by A.T. Murray, Ph.D. in two volumes. Cambridge, MA., Harvard University Press; London, William Heinemann, Ltd. 1924. . Online version at the Perseus Digital Library.
Homer, Homeri Opera in five volumes. Oxford, Oxford University Press. 1920. . Greek text available at the Perseus Digital Library.

Characters in the Iliad